Liocypris grandis is a species of ostracod which was long presumed extinct. It was rediscovered in the Western Cape of South Africa in 2003, having not been seen since its original description by Georg Ossian Sars in 1924. It was assessed as extinct for the IUCN Red List in 1996, and that assessment has not been updated.

References

External links 
 

Cyprididae
Freshwater crustaceans of Africa
Endemic crustaceans of South Africa
Crustaceans described in 1924
Taxa named by Georg Ossian Sars
Taxonomy articles created by Polbot
Podocopida genera
Monotypic crustacean genera